Low Kick and Hard Bop is the third studio album by Solex. It was released via Matador Records on September 11, 2001.

Reception
At Metacritic, which assigns a weighted average score out of 100 to reviews from mainstream critics, the album received an average score of 69% based on 12 reviews, indicating "generally favorable reviews".

Heather Phares of AllMusic gave the album 4.5 stars out of 5, saying, "it's an evocative and wildly creative, but not immediately accessible collection." Paul Cooper of Pitchfork gave the album a 6.8 out of 10, saying, "While I'm not asking for a duet with Peaches or a remix by the Streets, I would appreciate a new facet to the customary lo-fi diamond boogaloo."

Track listing

Personnel
Credits adapted from liner notes.
 Elisabeth Esselink – words, music, production, recording, mixing
 Andrew Blick – trumpet (on "Knee-high")
 Robert Lagendijk – Amsterdam-school of drum fills

References

External links
 

2001 albums
Solex (musician) albums
Matador Records albums